Patrick Broughton is a male former rower who competed for Great Britain and England.

Rowing career
Broughton represented Great Britain in two World Championships. He represented England and won a silver medal in the eight, at the 1986 Commonwealth Games in Edinburgh, Scotland.

References

English male rowers
Commonwealth Games medallists in rowing
Commonwealth Games silver medallists for England
Rowers at the 1986 Commonwealth Games
Medallists at the 1986 Commonwealth Games